Woody Island is located in Chiniak Bay,  east of Kodiak, Alaska. It was originally settled by the native Alutiiq people who called themselves Tangirnarmiut, "the people of Tangirnaq." They inhabited and used Woody Island for thousands of years. The Russians established an agricultural colony on Woody Island in 1792. It was officially designated Wood Island in 1894 by the US Post Office and was the primary coastal settlement for commerce and trade for many years. The first road in Alaska was built on Woody Island. Aside from the Aleut presence, the island has gone through four periods of occupation by non-natives, and is largely unoccupied today. The island is approximately 2.8 miles long from north to south and 1.8 miles wide and 13 miles in circumference.

The Woody Island Historic Archeological District, comprising sites of archaeological importance on the island was listed on the National Register of Historic Places in 2015.

Aleut settlement

The Alutiiq people used the island for "whaling, fishing, wood-working, sweat-baths, extensive trade," and build "large multi-roomed houses, and large villages with complex social ranking." When the Russians arrived in the 18th century, the native people were initially successful in driving them off. There followed a short period of accommodation and trade, after which the Russians engaged in brutal subjugation of the people, resulting in "epidemics, forced relocations, and extermination of those who resisted."

Russian naval officer Gavriil Davydov observed an Aleut winter ceremony on Woody Island in 1802. He wrote:

In 1805 a village on the east side of Woody Island was inhabited by 54 Alutiiq people. A smallpox epidemic struck the region in 1837 and the Russians forcefully amalgamated the survivors into seven villages, among them a village on Woody Island.

Industry and commerce

The Russian American Commercial Company operated an ice company on the island beginning in 1852.  They dammed Lake Tanignak, increasing its depth substantially. They cut and shipped ice south to California.  The company brought in the first iron rails to haul ice and horses to power a horse-powered saw which cut the ice into blocks.  A sawmill was built to produce not lumber, but sawdust that was used to insulate the ice for shipment south. The first road built in Alaska was graded around the island to allow the horses to be exercised. In 1867 the company was renamed the Kodiak Ice Co.

For much of the late half of the 19th century, many of the Aluttiq people on Woody Island were enslaved by the Russians to work for the ice harvesting companies during the winter. Conscripted by the Russians, they hunted sea otters and fur seals during the summer for their highly prized fur. In 1872 a Russian Orthodox Church was built on Woody Island. The church exerted a strong influence over the native population, replacing in many instances native ceremonies and observances with church-centered activities.

The sea otter and fur seal populations declined rapidly in the latter half of the 19th century due to over-harvesting, with about 100,000 sea otters and a correspondingly high number of fur seals being taken each year. By 1911 only about 2000 sea otters remained in 13 small remnant populations, making hunting unprofitable. Commercial taking of sea otters and fur seals were prohibited by the Fur Seal Treaty. The Aleuts were permitted to hunt them for subsistence purposes only.

In 1886, the Island was the commercial center for the Kodiak area. Services included the ice harvesting operation, a boat yard, a grist mill, the Alaska Commercial Company (formerly the Russian-American Company) wharf, and the only roads in Alaska connecting these facilities. The North American Commercial Company, a fur trading enterprise, established a presence there in 1891, including a store.

Religious usage

Ernest and Ida Roscoe built a Baptist Mission and orphanage on Woody Island in 1893. Over the next twenty years, the mission added a girls' quarters, boys' dormitory, office building, barn, carpenter shop, cannery, silo, and dining room. The mission provided homes for Aleut children who had lost their parents, but the Baptist missionaries sometimes brought children to the orphanage, even against their parents' will. The main building burned down in 1925, was rebuilt, and burned again in 1937.  The mission was then relocated to Kodiak on the mainland where a greater variety of services were more readily available.

U.S. Navy wireless station
The United States Navy built a wireless station on the island in 1911. Everyone but the watchman evacuated to Kodiak. During the ash fall, lightning struck one of the antenna which started a fire that burned most of the wireless station. Harry Martin, a survivor of the volcanic eruption, told U.S. Navy radioman Bart Phelps about the experience in 1924:

The wireless station was rebuilt and updated in 1914. The wireless station was decommissioned on February 28, 1931, and shortly thereafter the Federal government allowed the Territory of Alaska to use the remaining buildings for the Longwood School.

After the mission and orphanage was relocated to the mainland, the entire island's population declined rapidly. The Longwood School enrollment dropped from 71 in 1937 to 20 in 1939, and the school was permanently closed. Many of the natives moved to Kodiak where they were less dependent on subsistence living and could find jobs.

Air station built
In 1941, the Civil Aeronautics Administration built the Kadiak Naval Air Station including a runway, flight service station, remote air ground, remote transmitter, low frequency range beacon, and VHF link terminal facilities. These gathered and relayed weather and other aeronautical data to pilots. During World War II up to forty technicians and their families lived on the island. They maintained the teletypes, transmitters, and radio receivers essential to supporting military and civilian aircraft operating in the North Pacific.

In 1951 or 1952 the Russian Orthodox Church building, which had been abandoned for many years, was torn down. Former Navy facilities were converted to apartments and a school was built on in 1951 for the small community. The facility was automated in the early 1970s and the majority of the remaining FAA complex burned in 1979.

Current use
During the 1950s, the American Baptist Church began offering a non-denominational summer camp on the island, which is still in operation today. The FAA still maintains a radio beacon on the island for aircraft directional use.  There is no longer any public transportation to the island. The island is inhabited today by two "hermits" and is visited by two families owning summer homes there. The majority of land on Woody Island is private property, except for the Woody Island State Recreation Site a  wilderness area belonging to Alaska State Parks. The island is designated as the Leisnoi Alaska Native Village Statistical Area.

Demographics

Woody Island (or Leisnoi) first appeared on the 1880 U.S. Census as the unincorporated village of "Lesnova." Of 157 residents, 99 were Inuit, 56 were Creole (Mixed Russian and Native) and 2 were White. It did not appear on the 1890 census. It returned in 1900 as "Wood Island Settlement." In 1910-40, it returned as "Wood Island." In 1950-80, it returned as Woody Island. It was designated an Alaskan Native Village Statistical Area (ANVSA) in 1980. It did not appear on the 1990 or 2000 censuses. It last returned on the 2010 census as the ANVSA of Leisnoi, but reported 0 residents.

See also
National Register of Historic Places listings in Kodiak Island Borough, Alaska

References

Islands of Kodiak Island Borough, Alaska
Former populated places in Alaska
Islands of Alaska
Archaeological sites on the National Register of Historic Places in Alaska
Historic districts on the National Register of Historic Places in Alaska
National Register of Historic Places in Kodiak Island Borough, Alaska